Methyltransferase like 14 is a protein that in humans is encoded by the METTL14 gene.

References

Further reading